The SMA SR305-230 is an air/oil-cooled, horizontally opposed, four-cylinder, four-stroke, diesel piston aircraft engine. The engine is manufactured by SMA Engines, and is currently the only product of this French company. The engine is offered as a conversion package for the Cessna 182.  As of 2012 July, Cessna announced it will offer the 182 with this engine.  Delivery expected by 2nd quarter of 2013.  Cessna also stated the SMA engine will replace the current avgas engine.

The engine first flew in a Socata TB-20 in March 1998 and was officially introduced at the Paris Air Show in June 1999. French DGAC approval was attained in July 2001 with FAA certification following a year later.
Between 17 and 25 July 2006 a converted Cessna 182 (registration F-GJET) flew from Le Bourget to Oshkosh, Wisconsin.

Design
The SMA SR 305-230-1 is a four-cylinder, horizontally opposed turbocharged direct fuel injection diesel engine. The engine installation includes an electronic central processing unit (CPU) that continually calculates the proper fuel/air mixture.  If this unit fails completely during flight, the mechanical backup position is selected and the pilot can control the fuel/air mixture as required to complete the flight.

Full-throttle operation at sea level is at 90 inches (3 bar) of manifold pressure.  Unlike some aircraft engines, which recommend the maximum power setting be used only for five minutes during the initial takeoff stage, the SR 305 can be operated indefinitely at this setting, although normal cruise uses around 70 inches (2.3 bar) and economy cruise uses around 60 inches (2 bar) of manifold pressure.

The STC conversion on the Cessna 182 includes a new cowl, both to accommodate the different engine dimensions and to provide the required cooling airflow.  Belly-mounted cowl flaps are still used, but less cooling airflow is directed over the cylinder barrels and more cooling airflow is directed into side-mounted oil coolers.  About one-third of the engine cooling is provided by airflow over the cylinders; the remainder is provided by engine oil.  The engine's oil distribution system routes a large oil flow to hot zones in the cylinder heads and upper cylinder barrels, carrying the heat away to the oil coolers.

As of early 2008, SMA had provided over 50 conversion packages. (The installation is usually performed by other companies, not SMA.)  Most of those conversions were performed in Europe, with less than a dozen having been performed in North America.  The package costs around $75,000, and installation costs around $7,000.

The cost of conversion may be justified in areas where aviation gasoline costs significantly more than jet fuel, and by the fact that the diesel fuel flow at cruise is about 10 gallons (38 litres) per hour, compared to about 13.5 gallons (51 litres) per hour with the original engine.

Applications
 SMA SR305-230: Cessna 182
 SMA SR305-260E: Diamond DA50
 SMA SR305-230 ATLS GS-301 Batoor

Specifications

See also

References

External links

 

SMA aircraft engines
Air-cooled aircraft piston engines
Aircraft diesel engines
1990s aircraft piston engines